Pervagor melanocephalus is a Filefish from the Indo-West Pacific. It occasionally makes its way into the aquarium trade. It grows to a size of 16 cm in length.

References

External links 

 PERVAGOR MELANOCEPHALUS from New Caledonia (En/Fr)
 

Monacanthidae
Fish described in 1853